De Bortoli Wines is one of the larger privately owned companies in Australia and is known for its wide range of wines including the sweet white Noble One.

Wineries and vineyards 
De Bortoli Wines owns four wineries in four diverse Australian wine growing regions:
 Bilbul near Griffith in the Riverina region of New South Wales
 Near Cessnock in the Hunter Region of New South Wales
 Dixons Creek near Yarra Glen in the Yarra Valley in Victoria
 Rutherglen in the Rutherglen wine region in Victoria

The company has vineyards in the same regions as its wineries, along with the King Valley in Victoria.

Winemaking
The winemaking team is overseen by third generation winemaker Darren De Bortoli and his brother-in-law Steve Webber. In the early 1980s, Darren De Bortoli created the Noble One Botrytis Semillon. Steve Webber established the company's premium Yarra Valley winery in the early 1990s and is also responsible for overseeing the company's King Valley vineyards and Hunter Valley winery and vineyards.

The company quotes its philosophy as, "great wine begins in the vineyard", and that the winemaker should use minimal handling and interference in the winemaking process. They also state that wine should have a sense of regionality and be an expression of the soil in which it is grown.

Noble One
De Bortoli Wines Noble One Botrytis Semillon is a sweet white wine, developed by Darren De Bortoli during the 1980s.

Since its release, Noble One has been awarded 104 Trophies, 352 Gold medals and 113 International Awards. In 2005 screw cap closures were placed on 50% of the 750ml bottles of 2003 Noble One in a trial that attempted to ensure fruit intensity and freshness for consumers. De Bortoli Wines have kept the 375ml, 50% of the 750ml and all export stock under cork. However, in an industry where issues over cork taint keep arising, approximately 34% of wines are sealed with some type of synthetic closure.

Noble One was given its name in 1990 as a result of the bilateral agreement between Australia and the European Economic Community in which Australia agreed to phase out the use of European names on wine labels. Previously the wine was known as 'Sauternes,' but today it is simply called Noble One.

History
During Darren De Bortoli's years at Roseworthy Agricultural College, Australia's premier winemaking institute, a lot of development work was being done on Botrytis wine styles. While there, De Bortoli decided to make a botrytis affected wine of his own. At that time (1982) there was a surplus of Semillon grapes, a thin skinned, tight bunched varietal particularly susceptible to extensive, uniform botrytis infection. The resulting wine went on to win numerous awards including Best Botrytis Wine at the International Wine and Spirit Competition in 1984.

History
De Bortoli Wines was established in 1928 by Vittorio & Giuseppina De Bortoli and rapidly expanded under the direction of their son, Deen De Bortoli]. The family history is documented in a book called Celebrazione! launched in 2003 to celebrate De Bortoli Wines' 75th Anniversary.

Deen De Bortoli (born 1936) was the chairman of De Bortoli Wines Pty Limited. He was born in 1936, and at age 15 he left school to help Vittorio and Giuseppina, his parents run the family business. He married Emeri De Bortoli in 1958, and lived in Bilbul, New South Wales, his whole life. They had four children who all work for the company today. Deen also featured in the 2002 episode of the ABC's Dynasties television series titled The De Bortolis of Griffith. 

Darren De Bortoli (born 1960) is currently the managing director of De Bortoli Wines Pty Limited. He was born in 1960 and then studied winemaking at Roseworthy College in South Australia, where he graduated with a Bachelor of Applied Science in Oenology, in 1982. Darren is well known for his Botrytis Semillon, Noble One. At the age of 33, Darren was appointed Managing Director. He was also featured in the 2002 episode of the ABC's Dynasties television series titled "The De Bortolis of Griffith" which tracked the growth over three generations of the family business from Italian immigrants into one of Australia's largest family wine companies.

Darren's daughter Leanne manages the Yarra and King Valley wineries with her husband Stephen Webber. Webber is also the Chief Winemaker, for the Yarra Valley Winery of the De Bortoli family business, established in 1928. He was awarded 'Winemaker of the Year by Gourmet Traveller WINE' in 2007.

Achievements
 The Graham Gregory Award for Services to the NSW Wine Industry, in 1995.
 The Inaugural Golden Plate Award for his contribution to the wine industry in the Riverina.
 The Jimmy Watson Award for 1996 Yarra Valley Golf Station Reserve Shiraz, in 1997.
 Past President of the MIA Winemakers Association.
 Australian Wine Research Institute board member
 Chairman of Judges Melbourne Wine Show
2007 Winemaker of the Year by GourmetTraveller WINE

Environment and technology
As a family owned company, De Bortoli Wines has often taken a longer-term view of the world than a traditional corporate equivalent.

Examples include the consideration of concepts such as data sovereignty and commitment to open standards based computing, leading to the organisation standardising on the OpenDocument Format for office productivity files though the use of OpenOffice.org 2.0. Other notable technology rollouts include TYPO3 for both the Internet site & corporate intranet, Jedox and Pentaho for business intelligence, dotProject for collaborative project management, Fedora Directory Server with SAMBA 3 for authentication & file serving, and the rollout of Linux clients on the desktop.

Examples of De Bortoli Wines' long-term view of environmental sustainability include:
 Participating in the Greenhouse Challenge and Packaging Covenant and the Australian Wine Industry Environmental Stewardship program.
 Adopting an integrated Pest Management System in the vineyard minimising the use of chemical sprays.
 Purchasing easy to clean winery equipment to minimise water usage, for example dry cake discharge filters and centrifuges.
 Adopting recycling practices at all sites e.g. composting of winery skins and stalks, restaurant compostables, separation of bottles, cardboard, cork, and plastic.
 Removing all Sodium based products from the Griffith site because of concerns relating to salinity in the environment.

See also
 Australian wine
 Riverina
 Griffith, New South Wales

References

External links
De Bortoli Wines homepage
"The wine doctor" Australian profiles - De Bortoli 

Wineries in New South Wales
Wineries in Victoria (Australia)
Privately held companies of Australia
Australian wine
Family-owned companies of Australia
Australian companies established in 1928
Food and drink companies established in 1928
Liqueurs
Vermouth